The Allison-Reinkeh House is a historic house in Hamilton, Montana, U.S.. It was built in 1889 for Martha Allison-Reinkeh, a homesteader from New York. Prior to moving to Montana, she married William C. Reinkeh, and they ran the Allison Telegraph Institute in Philadelphia. The Reinkehs became large landowners in Montana. The house was later purchased by William Fullerton, followed by Robert Kolski.

The house was designed in the Queen Anne architectural style. It has been listed on the National Register of Historic Places since August 26, 1988.

References

National Register of Historic Places in Ravalli County, Montana
Victorian architecture in Montana
Queen Anne architecture in Montana
Houses completed in 1889
Houses in Ravalli County, Montana
Houses on the National Register of Historic Places in Montana
Hamilton, Montana